Dump is a community in Toledo District, Belize. The community is located on the Southern Highway approximately 20 km from Punta Gorda. It lies at an elevation of 34 meters above sea level. Two secondary schools are located in Dump: the Centre for Employment Training, and Julian Cho Technical High School.

References

External links
 

Populated places in Toledo District
Toledo West